Ernakulam Town (also known as Ernakulam North, code: ERN) is one of the main railway stations in the city of Kochi, Kerala, India.

Administration 
The station is operated by the Southern Railway zone of the Indian Railways and is an 'A–grade' station under Thiruvananthapuram railway division.

Background 
This is a convenient station to alight for passengers travelling to northern suburbs of Kochi city and nearby areas. The major railway station in Kochi is the Ernakulam Junction.

Location 
Ernakulam Town railway station is situated between Kaloor and Kacheripady. This area of the city is known as "North" due to the presence of the station which was previously known as "Ernakulam North" (locals still refer to it as North station).

The main entrance is situated on the western side of the railway line near to Kacheripady, while a smaller eastern entrance is located on SRM Road. Both entrances are 300 metres from Banerji Road.

All city bus routes to and from the MG Road, Menaka and Fort Kochi/Mattancherry areas stop on both sides of the North overbridge on Banerji road, at "North" and "Lissie" bus stops. The Kochi Metro's Lissie station is located 300 metres away from the eastern entrance.

Infrastructure 
The station has two  platforms.

See also
Cochin Harbour Terminus

Transport in Kochi

Thiruvananthapuram railway division

References

External links

Thiruvananthapuram railway division
Railway stations in Kochi
Railway stations in India opened in 1890